Aldent University is an Albanian accredited higher institution specializing in the field of stomatology. The university was founded in 2006 by Adem Alushi.

See also
 List of universities in Albania

References

Universities in Albania
Educational institutions established in 2006
2006 establishments in Albania